Patapius is a genus of spiny-legged bugs in the family Leptopodidae. There are about seven described species in Patapius.

Species
These seven species belong to the genus Patapius:
 Patapius africanus Drake & Hoberlandt, 1951
 Patapius angolensis Drake & Hoberlandt, 1951
 Patapius corticalis Linnavuori, 1974
 Patapius integerrimus Linnavuori, 1974
 Patapius sentus Drake & Hoberlandt, 1951
 Patapius spinosus (Rossi, 1790)
 Patapius thaiensis Cobben, 1968

References

Further reading

 
 

Heteroptera genera
Articles created by Qbugbot
Leptopodidae